Daniel Falzon (born 16 March 1994) is a professional motorcycle racer from Adelaide, Australia. He competes in the Australian Superbike Championship, aboard a Yamaha YZF-R1. He is the 2013 and 2014 Australian Supersport Champion and also the 2012 Australian Superstock 600 Champion.

In 2012 Daniel won the ASBK Superstock championship by 72.5 points and secured the lap record at 3 of the 4 tracks visited. The same year, he was also a contestant on the One HD TV program, The Ultimate Rider. In 2013 he moved up to the highly contested Supersport category with hopes of finishing in the top 5. As the rookie in the class, he surprised everyone by leading every round and eventually winning the Supersport Championship. One of the youngest riders to have ever done so.

In 2014 Daniel competed in the Australian Superbike Championship in the Supersport class which he won to become the first person to win the Australian Supersport Championship back to back. In addition, he competed in the high exposure Phillip Island Championship which is run in conjunction with the Australian rounds of the World Superbike (WSBK) and MotoGP Championships. At the Australian round of the MotoGP Championship, Daniel won all 3 races to secure his 5th National Title in 6 years.

Motorcycle Racing results

†Result at the point at which the championship was abandoned

Asterisk (*) symbol denotes a season that is still in progress

Notable Achievements

2008- Collingrove Hillclimb Junior - 1st Place

2009- Collingrove Hillclimb Junior - 1st Place

2009- George Carrick Open Championship - 2nd Place

2009- Phillip Island 6Hr Endurance Race (Superstock 600) - 1st Place 

2011- Nominated as South Australian Male Youth Athlete of the Year

2012- Was one of 7 contestants on the Channel One HD reality TV series, The Ultimate Rider.

2013- Finalist for South Australian Athlete of the Year.

Current Lap Records
Daniel holds official lap records at the following tracks in the listed classes. 
Hidden Valley Raceway - Superstock 600 - 1:11.891 
Queensland Raceway - Superstock 600 - 1:12.833 
Mallala Motor Sport Park - Superstock 600 - 1:09.791 
Hidden Valley Raceway - Supersport 600 - 1:09.458 
Barbagallo Raceway - Superbike 1000 - 55.446

TV Appearance
In October 2012, Daniel was selected as one of seven contestants to take part in the first season of a new reality TV series called, The Ultimate Rider. The show is based around several challenges which each rider completes and scores points for in the hope to win the prize of A$20,000 and a contract with Honda Factory Racing. The program was broadcast on Channel One HD in October 2012 and repeated in March 2013.

Moto2 Replacement Ride
In October 2013, the Jon Daniels Racing Team were contacted by the Technomag-CarXpert Moto2 Team to have Daniel replace injured rider, Randy Krummenacher in the Australian round of the 2013 MotoGP Championship. Although the offer was accepted, the opportunity was lost when the Moto2 bike was damaged beyond repair in a large accident during the Malaysian MotoGP race just one week prior to the Australian round.

Seasons in Detail
(Motorsport Table Legend)

2008

2009

2010

2011

2012

2013

2014

†Results when championship was abandoned

2015

Asterisk (*) symbol denotes a season that is still in progress

External links
 Jon Daniels Racing Website - Official Jon Daniels Racing Website
 Jon Daniels Racing Facebook Page - Official Jon Daniels Racing Facebook Page
 JD Racing YouTube Channel Official Jon Daniels Racing YouTube Channel
 ASBK – Australian Superbike Championship Official Website
 The Ultimate Rider - One HD Reality TV Show

References

Living people
Australian motorcycle racers
1994 births
Superbike World Championship riders